is a Japanese voice actor, singer, and composer from Tokyo. He is currently affiliated with 81 Produce.

Career
In 2017, he was active as a Vocaloid producer under name 21SeikiP.

In 2018, he landed his first main role as voice actor through television anime Wotakoi: Love Is Hard for Otaku. The following year, he received the 13th of Seiyuu Awards for best singing award along with other Hypnosis Mic cast. In 2021, he produced another Vocaloid song under his own name. The song titled "Magic Number" was specifically made for the game he is in, Project Sekai: Colorful Stage!. Vocaloid producer Oster Project was involved with arrangement of the song.

On August 26, 2022, he made his solo singer debut under A-Sketch's Astro Voice label with his first single  release on September 21.

His special skills include playing violin and piano. He is also a member of UMake with Yoshiki Nakajima, where he also serves as the composer.

Notable works

Anime 
 The Idolmaster SideM (2017) as Michio Hazama
 Also in The IdolMaster Side M: Riyuu Atte Mini! (2018)
 Wotakoi: Love Is Hard for Otaku (2018) as Hirotaka Nifuji
Otona nya Koi no Shikata ga Wakaranee! (2018) as Shuuji Majima (standard version)
 Fire in His Fingertips (2019, 2021) as Sōma Mizuno (standard version)
Show by Rock!! Mashumairesh!! (2020) as Yasu
The Titan's Bride (2020) as Kōichi Mizuki
Hypnosis Mic: Division Rap Battle: Rhyme Anima (2020) as Doppo Kannonzaka
2.43: Seiin High School Boys Volleyball Team (2021) as Shinichiro Oda
Dragon Goes House-Hunting (2021) as Hero
World Trigger Season 3 (2021) as Kazuto Tonо̄ka
Life with an Ordinary Guy Who Reincarnated into a Total Fantasy Knockout (2022) as Hinata Tachibana (male)
My Home Hero (2023) as Kyōichi Majima
Oshi no Ko (2023) as Gorō

Anime films 
Toku Touken Ranbu: Hanamaru ~Setsugetsuka~ (2022) as Kuwana Gou

Video games 
 The Idolmaster SideM (2017) as Michio Hazama
 Promise of Wizard (2019) as Faust
 Hypnosis Microphone -Alternative Rap Battle- (2020) as Doppo Kannonzaka 
 Disney Twisted-Wonderland (2020) as Divus Crewel
 Project Sekai: Colorful Stage! feat. Hatsune Miku (2021) as Toya Aoyagi
 Honkai: Star Rail (2021) as Danheng
 Fate/Grand Order (2022) as James Moriarty (Ruler)

Dubbing 
 Gossip Girl as Max Wolfe (Thomas Doherty)
 Thomas & Friends: All Engines Go as James (Luke Marty)

Discography

Cover album

Digital singles

EP

References

External links 

Official agency profile 
Official artist website 
Artist page at A-Sketch 

Living people
Male voice actors from Kyoto
Musicians from Kyoto
Japanese male pop singers
Japanese male video game actors
Japanese male voice actors
1988 births
Anime singers
21st-century Japanese male actors
21st-century Japanese male singers
21st-century Japanese singers
Vocaloid musicians